Novonikolayevka may refer to:
 Novosibirsk, Russia
 Novonikolayevka, Azerbaijan
 Novonikolayevka, Kyrgyzstan, a village in Chuy Region, Kyrgyzstan